Stream processors may refer to:

Stream processing, a technique used to accelerate the processing of many types of video and image computations
Stream Processors, Inc, a semiconductor company that has commercialized stream processing for DSP applications
Event stream processing, a set of technologies designed to assist the construction of event-driven information systems